Henry M. Polhemus and Lewis Augustus Coffin, Jr formed the New York-based architectural firm of Polhemus & Coffin. Together they contributed to a joint publication, Small French Buildings: The Architecture of Town and Country, with 183 plates of sketches, illustrations and photos, published by Charles Scribner & Sons in 1921. Their modest French country manor "Mille Fleurs" designed for Mrs Daniel Guggenheim on the extensive Gould-Guggenheim estate in Port Washington, New York, on the Gold Coast of Long Island, was completed in 1932; it is modeled on the vineyard Château Beauregard, Pommerol. In Newport, Rhode Island, they designed "Champ Soleil", on Bellevue Avenue, a small 22-room French manor that was completed in 1929. A lively debate currently underway on the internet, questions the inspiration for the design and whether or not Champ Soleil was modeled on the famous French Norman chateau named "La Lanterne." a residence near Versailles. Designed for Lucy Drexel Dalgren in 1929, at one time Champ Soleil was the residence of Russell Aitken, artist, big game hunter, Associate Editor of Field & Stream Magazine and step-father of Sunny von Bülow. In 2006, Acanthus Press published a book authored by James Archer Abbott, Jansen - 20th Century Decorators, by James Archer Abbott, which features a chapter about the 1950s update of Champ Soleil, and contains a few detailed renderings and interior photos, detailing work done by famed French decorating firm Maison Jansen.

The firm also designed some apartment buildings and office structures in Manhattan: - 232 Madison Avenue, at 37th Street (1925, standing), a 16-storey office building with streamlined neo-Gothic details, and 140 East 54th Street (1931, demolished). Lewis Coffin, who had graduated from The Choate School (now Choate Rosemary Hall) in Wallingford, Connecticut in 1908, designed the school's Winter Exercise Building (1931, now the Johnson Athletic Center).

Lewis Augustus Coffin, Jr was born in 1892 and was the son of noted Otolaryngology surgeon, Dr Lewis Augustus Coffin, Sr. In addition to graduating from The Choate School in 1908, he went on to attend Columbia University to acquire his Certificate in Architecture in 1914. He began a solo career in 1917 and then joined Henry Polhemus as partner, to form Polhemus & Coffin in 1919. Lewis A Coffin's affinity and passion for French country structures and style became quite evident as the firm designed many notable single dwelling homes throughout the New Jersey, New York and Connecticut areas. They travelled to France numerous times for research and to survey examples for their book. He also designed a few homes in the once artist community (one-time summer residence of  Mark Twain),  Onteora Park Historic District just outside Tannersville, Greene County, upstate New York, as this had been a long-time family summer retreat for decades. Onteora Park was added to the National Historical Register in 2003, which included at least one of Coffin's designs, however the remaining designs must wait until the time qualification is reached. Lewis A Coffin, Jr died in 1963 in New York City.

Their draftsman George Hickey established an independent practise designing houses with a French flavor, many of them modeled on sketches from Polhemus & Coffin’s Small French Buildings. His most famous house in this genre, "Stonecrop", Cold Spring Harbor (1957), owes its reputation in large part to the more famous garden laid out and planted by the owner, Frank Cabot.

An archive of photographs of their residential work in the Northeast, much of it in an unobtrusive vernacular  Colonial style, is among the Gottscho-Schleisner Collection (Library of Congress).

See also
Military Park Building

Notes

References
Robert B. MacKay, Anthony K. Baker and Carol A. Traynor, Long Island Country Houses and Their Architects, 1860-1940 (1997)

Architecture firms of the United States